Mamoiada is a comune (municipality) in the Province of Nuoro in the Italian region of Sardinia, located about  north of Cagliari and about  southwest of Nuoro.

The town is known for its traditional carnival costumes, including distinctive masks worn by the mamuthones and issohadores. The local museum houses some masks also from other part of Sardinia and Europe.

Mamoiada borders the following municipalities: Fonni, Gavoi, Nuoro, Ollolai, Orani, Orgosolo, Sarule.

Demographic evolution

References

Cities and towns in Sardinia